Niklas Forsmoo (born 9 April 1983) is a Swedish handball player, currently playing for the Swedish Elitserien side Lugi HF. He has previously played for Swedish Elitserien club IFK Skövde, with whom he won the EHF Challenge Cup in 2004. 

Forsmoo has made 5 appearances for the Swedish national handball team.

External links
 Player info

1983 births
Living people
Swedish male handball players
Swedish expatriate sportspeople in Denmark
Lugi HF players